The second season of Blue Bloods, a police procedural drama series created by Robin Green and Mitchell Burgess, premiered on CBS September 23, 2011 and ended May 11, 2012. Ed Zuckerman served as executive producer and showrunner for the season after Green and Burgess departed the show at the end of the first season.

Cast 
Donnie Wahlberg, Bridget Moynahan, Will Estes, Len Cariou are first credited, with Tom Selleck receiving an "and" billing at the close of the main title sequence. Jennifer Esposito retains her "also starring" credit from the first season, whilst Amy Carlson and Sami Gayle are also credited as "also starring" during the episodes that they appear.

The cast for season 2 includes:

Main cast 
Tom Selleck as Police Commissioner Francis "Frank" Reagan
Donnie Wahlberg as  Detective 1st Grade Daniel "Danny" Reagan
Bridget Moynahan as ADA Erin Reagan
Will Estes as Officer Jamison "Jamie" Reagan
Len Cariou as Henry Reagan
Amy Carlson as Linda Reagan 
Sami Gayle as Nicole "Nicky" Reagan-Boyle

Recurring cast 
Jennifer Esposito as Detective 1st Grade Jackie Curatola
Abigail Hawk as Detective 1st Grade Abigail Baker
Gregory Jbara as Deputy Commissioner of Public Information Garrett Moore
Robert Clohessy as Sergeant Sidney "Sid" Gormley
Nicholas Turturro as Sargeant Anthony Renzulli 
Ato Essandoh as Reverend Darnell Potter 
Tony Terraciano as Jack Reagan 
Andrew Terraciano as Sean Reagan

Episodes

Ratings

References

External links

2011 American television seasons
2012 American television seasons
Blue Bloods (TV series)